"Sex on Fire" is the first single released from American rock band Kings of Leon's fourth studio album, Only by the Night. The song gave Kings of Leon their first number-one single in Australia, Finland, Ireland, and the United Kingdom, charting at the top spot on digital downloads alone in the latter country, before its physical release. In September 2009, it was Britain's second most-downloaded digital single ever. The song has sold 1.2 million copies in the United Kingdom as of November 2012. It has also gained significant popularity in the United States, reaching number one on the Hot Modern Rock Tracks chart and number 56 on the Billboard Hot 100, making it the band's second highest-charting song there on the former chart.

In 2008, the song earned the band their first Grammy nominations. The song was nominated for Best Rock Song, and won the award for Best Rock Vocal Performance by a Duo or Group. In addition, the album earned a nomination for Best Rock Album. Channel V Australia named the song as the third biggest hit of 2008. It was voted number one in Triple J Hottest 100 countdown for 2008. Following the success of the follow-up single "Use Somebody" in the United States on pop radio, the track was re-serviced to US pop radio in November. Remixes of both songs were used for the runway soundtrack in the 2009 Victoria's Secret Fashion Show.

Composition
Musically, "Sex on Fire" has been described as alternative rock. The song was written about lead singer Caleb's then-girlfriend (and now-wife), model Lily Aldridge. In an interview with Robbie, Marieke and the Doctor on Australian radio station Triple J, Nathan Followill explained that the band never intended the song to be named "Sex on Fire" and that it was not intended to be about sexuality.

Nathan also said that some lyrics tried were "Socks on Fire", "Snatch on Fire", and "Cocks on Fire". The song is played in the key of E major at a tempo of 153 bpm. The vocal range is B–G.

Critical reception
"Sex on Fire" received generally positive reviews. Digital Spy rated the song four stars out of five, describing it as "a truly stirring single that will be a definite highlight on their winter arena tour". Planet Sound also rated the song 9/10. However, Caleb Followill originally thought the song was "terrible"; according to Spin Magazine, it was almost ditched during recording. Despite giving the album a 4 out of 5, Spin thought the song was "silly". The song was number 40 on Rolling Stones list of the 100 Best Songs of 2008. The song was used for the trailer of the 2009 movie Stay Cool.

In 2016, Johnny Borrell of Razorlight called this song "the apex, death and afterlife of landfill indie all in one go" and noted its similarity to Stereophonics's "Dakota" from 2005.

Chart performance
In the United Kingdom, "Sex on Fire" entered the official UK Singles Chart at number one on September 14, 2008 ― for the week ending date September 20, 2008 ― and went on to an unbroken 42 weeks on the chart, only dropping out due to the surge in sales of Michael Jackson titles immediately after his death, but after a two-week absence it was back for another 37 weeks, re-entering the top 10 of the UK Singles Chart at number six in September 2009. Further reappearances extended its tally of weeks to 90, making it the third most charted single of all time.

In Germany, the single debuted at number 97 on the German Singles Chart, and began to rise and fall in the next several weeks. In its 32nd week on the chart, the song finally reached its peak of number 33. As of February 2011, the song had been on the chart for 60 weeks, a huge effort for a single that did not reach the top 20. In February 2011, due to the long stay on the German Singles Chart, the single was certificated with Gold for more than 150,000 copies sold.

Music video
The director of the music video for "Sex on Fire" was Sophie Muller. As of February 2022, the video has over 425 million views on YouTube. At the end of the video, Caleb opens his mouth and smoke starts coming out of his mouth. In the video, the band is seen playing in the next room at an abandoned factory. Some of the scenes in the video shows Caleb's brothers holding Caleb, who is untied to a soft mattress, Nathan washing his hair in a black water tub, Matthew explaining to Nathan and Jared about Caleb and also Matthew eating a chicken wing and Caleb looking at strange shadows while lying on a soft mattress.

Track listings
7-inch vinyl
 "Sex on Fire"
 "Beneath the Surface"

CD single
 "Sex on Fire"
 "Knocked Up" (Live @ Oxegen '08)

Charts

Weekly charts

Year-end charts

Decade-end charts

Certifications

Release history

See also 
List of best-selling singles in Australia

References

2008 singles
Kings of Leon songs
Irish Singles Chart number-one singles
Music videos directed by Sophie Muller
Number-one singles in Australia
Number-one singles in Finland
RCA Records singles
Song recordings produced by Jacquire King
Songs written by Caleb Followill
Songs written by Jared Followill
Songs written by Matthew Followill
Songs written by Nathan Followill
Sony Music singles
UK Singles Chart number-one singles